RAF Collyweston is a former Royal Air Force satellite station located  south west of Stamford, Lincolnshire and  north east of Corby, Northamptonshire,  England.

The airfield was a satellite station of RAF Wittering and used by the Enemy Aircraft Flight during the Second World War.

History
Founded in 1917 as No. 5 Training Depot Station, the station was renamed RAF Collyweston following formation of the Royal Air Force, via merger of the Royal Flying Corps (RFC) and the Royal Naval Air Service (RNAS) on 1 April 1918. The airfield was absorbed as a satellite station of RAF Wittering in 1939. A unit at Collyweston during the war was No. 1426 (Captured Enemy Aircraft) Flight, they flew and assessed enemy aircraft that crashed or forced landed.

In 1941 the runways of Wittering and Collyweston were joined to make one 2-mile long, grass runway.

The following units were here at some point:
 No. 23 Squadron RAF (1940)
 No. 133 Squadron RAF (1941)
 No. 152 Squadron RAF (1941-42 & 1942)
 No. 266 Squadron RAF (1940 & 1941)
 Detachment from No. 288 Squadron RAF (1943 & 1944 & 1945)
 No. 349 Squadron RAF (1943)
 No. 658 Squadron RAF (1944)

References

Citations

Bibliography

Royal Air Force stations in Northamptonshire
Military units and formations established in 1917
1917 establishments in England